Muhammad Abdul Jabbar Jahanabadi was an Islamic scholar and secretary general of Befaqul Madarisil Arabia Bangladesh. He has been described as a pioneer to Islamic education in the erstwhile newly founded country of Bangladesh.

Early life and education
Jahanabadi was born into a Bengali Muslim family from the village of Sahabatkathi in Kachua, Bagerhat. He was the second child among a family of five brothers and a sister. His father was Shaykh Nasimuddin, and his studies began at home with his family as well as the local maktab where he learnt the Quran. In 1961, Abdul Jabbar completed his master's degree from the faculty of Hadith studies at the Ashraful Uloom Madrasa in Bara Katara, Dacca.

Career
Jahanabadi's career began at the madrasa he graduated from - he started teaching at the Bara Katara Madrasa in the 1960s. He was also responsible for the Bangladesh Qawmi Madrasah Education Board, then under the leadership of Nur Uddin Gohorpuri, from its creation in 1978 until his death. Jahanabadi was one of the key leaders to advocate for the recognition of Qawmi Madrasa certificates by the Government of Bangladesh. He authored a pamphlet, was the first to submit a paper to a government office and the syllabus of the proposed Qaumi Charter was made by him. He was the first person to be officially recognized by the Qaumi Charter.

He created and managed many madrasas. Before becoming secretary-general of Befaqul Madarisil Arabia Bangladesh in 1992, Jahanabadi served as the Dhaka city General Secretary of Jamiat Ulema-e-Islam Bangladesh. He became a founding member of the Jamia Islamia Darul Uloom Madania in Jatrabari Thana, and served as a teacher there for a short time.

Death and legacy
Jahanabadi died on 18 November 2016 at 79 years of age, in a Dhaka hospital at 10:10am. He had been suffering from respiratory problems in the heart and kidneys. After Isha prayer, his janaza was performed in the national mosque of Bangladesh, Baitul Mukarram. The Bangladeshi Minister of Education at the time, Nurul Islam Nahid of the Awami League political party, expressed his condolences for who he viewed to be a pioneer to Bangladesh's madrasa system. Maqbul Ahmed, leader of the Bangladesh Jamaat-e-Islami political party, also expressed his sympathy.

Written works
Jahanabadi has written and edited numerous books, school textbooks, poems, stories and essays. His works include:

Textbooks

See also
Abul Hasan Jashori
Qazi Mu'tasim Billah
Muhammad Wakkas

References

External links
 Al Jamia Al Islamia Patiya
 Bangladesh Qawmi Madrasah Education Board
 Official Website of Darul Uloom Muinul Islam Hathazari

Deobandis
20th-century Muslim scholars of Islam
21st-century Muslim scholars of Islam
Bangladeshi Sunni Muslim scholars of Islam
Bengali Muslim scholars of Islam
1937 births
2016 deaths
People from Bagerhat District
21st-century Bengalis
20th-century Bengalis